Cool & Dre are a record production and songwriting duo from North Miami, Florida, consisting of Marcello "Cool" Antonio Valenzano and Andre "Dre" Christopher Lyon. The duo are best known for their work with Terror Squad founder Fat Joe, first collaborating on the albums Jealous Ones Still Envy and Loyalty in 2001 and 2002 respectively, Lil Wayne's Tha Carter II, Tha Carter III, Tha Carter IV, and Tha Carter V, and more recently their work with Jay-Z and Beyonce on their collaborative album, Everything Is Love,  2018.

History
The duo have also worked extensively with rappers The Game, Nas, Queen Latifah, Ja Rule, Rick Ross, Remy Ma, Kendrick Lamar and many others. Their hits include The Game and 50 Cent's Grammy-nominated 2005 hit, "Hate It or Love It", Juvenile's "Rodeo", Ja Rule's "New York", Fat Joe's Grammy-nominated 2016 hit, “All the Way Up", and Lil Wayne's "On Fire".

To date, their work has sold over 75 million records worldwide. Cool & Dre started their record company Epidemic Music in 2004. The artists currently signed to Epidemic Music are Kent Jones, Eric Leon, and Tom G. In 2016, Epidemic Music released Kent Jones's debut single "Don't Mind" which peaked on the Billboard Hot 100 chart at #8 and sold over two million copies.

Epidemic Records
The duo started their own record label, Epidemic Records. They signed their first artist, Kent Jones, as a joint record deal with We the Best Music Group and Epic Records. Most recently, the pair signed Vero Beach, FL, artist Eric Leon, and Tampa, FL, rapper Tom G.

Artists 
Dre
Kent Jones
Tom G
Eric Leon

Production discography

Singles produced

Notes

References

African-American record producers
American hip hop record producers
American musical duos
Cash Money Records artists
Hip hop duos
Musical groups established in 2001
Musical groups from Miami
Record production duos
Southern hip hop groups
American songwriting teams
Singer-songwriters from Florida